Highway 914 is a provincial highway in the north-west and far north regions of the Canadian province of Saskatchewan. It begins at a turn in Highway 165 and officially ends at Key Lake mine. Highway 914 goes north through scenic parts of Saskatchewan, including Pinehouse Lake and Gordon Lake, and does not intersect with any province-owned roads between 165 and Key Lake Mine. Highway 914 is about 268 km (167 mi) long.

Along its entire length, it passes through only one town, Pinehouse.

Although the official highway map of Saskatchewan shows the highway terminating at Key Lake, Google Maps and its aerial photography shows the road actually continues on to the McArthur River uranium mine further to the north. Access to this portion of the road is restricted, and is therefore not part of the official highway network.

Major intersections

See also 
Roads in Saskatchewan
Transportation in Saskatchewan

References 

914